Oppi A. J. Untracht (November 17, 1922 – July 5, 2008) was an American master metalsmith, educator, and writer.

Biography 
Born in New York City, Untracht obtained his Master of Fine Arts at Columbia University in 1947. Originally trained as a photographer, he studied Indian arts and crafts and later became an expert on the jewelry of India and Nepal. His first book, Metal Techniques for Craftsmen is considered a standard training textbook for silversmiths.

Untracht married Finnish designer Saara Hopea, and moved permanently to Finland in 1967. Untracht died in Porvoo in 2008.

Bibliography 
Metal Techniques for Craftsmen (1968). 
Jewelry Concepts and Technology (1982). 
Saara Hopea Untracht: Elämä ja työ — Life and Work (1988). 
Traditional Jewelry of India (1997).

References 

1922 births
2008 deaths
20th-century American artists
21st-century American artists
American expatriates in Finland
American silversmiths
Columbia University School of the Arts alumni